The large diameter centrifuge, or LDC, is any centrifuge extending several meters, which can rotate samples to change their acceleration in space to enhance the effect of gravity. Large diameter centrifuges are used to understand the effect of hyper-gravity (gravitational strengths stronger than that of the Earth) on biological samples, including and not limiting to plants, organs, bacteria, and astronauts (Such as NASA's Human Performance Centrifuge) or non-biological samples to undertake experiments in the field of fluid dynamics, geology, biochemistry and more.

Description 

More often, the LDC is generally termed with the centrifuge situated within a dome structure at the European Space Agency (ESA)'s campus known as ESTEC. This centrifuge is an 8-m diameter four-arm centrifuge available for research. A total of six gondolas, each being able to carry a 80 kg payload, can spin at a maximum of 20 times the Earth's gravity, or a maximum of 67 revolutions per minute.  Full technical specification are available for free at the ESA website.

Competition and grants 
The European Space Agency (ESA) and UNOOSA lets students compete with a research proposal for the use of the LDC. These competitions are known as the 'Spin Your thesis!'. When the proposal is accepted, they are guided at ESA/ESTEC to use the LDC. Support is given for a variety of different fields including biology, physics and chemistry.

See also 

 Gravitropism
 Random positioning machine
 Free Fall Machine
 Clinostat

References 

Laboratory equipment
Gravitational instruments